Gavrud Rural District may refer to:
 Gavrud Rural District (Kermanshah Province)
 Gavrud Rural District (Kurdistan Province)